Francis Lalanne (born Francis-José Lalanne on 8 August 1958 in Bayonne) is a French-Uruguayan singer, songwriter and poet. He is the brother of composer Jean-Félix Lalanne and film director René Manzor.

Free Art 
He opposed the HADOPI law in 2009 and has supported the French free software community saying that the purpose of art is not to make money but conscience, and it is the duty of any author to promote the free dissemination of this conscience. He wrote the book Révoltons-nous, published in August 2011 under the free art license.

Political commitment
Francis Lalanne was several times a candidate in elections under the ecological banner, was a supporter of the yellow vests movement. He led a Yellow Alliance list in the European elections of May 2019, obtaining 0.54% of the votes.

On 22 February 2021, he was investigated for "provocation to the commission of attacks on the fundamental interests of the nation" after he signed an op-ed, published on the FranceSoir website, calling to "put the State out of harm's way", the Paris public prosecutor's office said on Monday 22 February.

Discography

Studio albums 

 1979: Rentre chez toi
 1980: Francis Lalanne
 1981: Toi mon vieux copain
 1982: Celle qui m'a emmené
 1984: Amis d'en France
 1985: Coup de foudre
 1986: Mai 86
 1988: De Corazón
 1990: Avec toi
 1992: Tendresses
 1994: Les Inédits
 1996: Face cachée
 2000: Sans papiers
 2003: D'une vie à l'autre
 2005: Reptile
 2009: Ouvrir son cœur
 2010: Blaïte music

Live albums 

 1983: Lalanne à Pantin
 1993: Zénith 93
 2006: Au Casino de Paris

Compilations 

 1995: Flash-Back
 2007: Best of

Publications 

 1986: Ajedhora, Flammarion.
 1993: Le Roman d'Arcanie, Les Belles Lettres.
 1994: Les Carnets de Lucifer, Les Belles Lettres.
 1995: Le Journal de Joseph, Éditions du Rocher.
 1997: D'Amour et de Mots, Les Belles Lettres. Tristan Tzara prize in 1997.
 1999: Éliade ou l'Idéale, Les Belles Lettres.
 2000: Le Petit Livre de l'Enfant, Éditions du Rocher, with co-author Stella Sulak.
 2003: Drac. ou le Soliloque du Vampire, Les Belles Lettres.
 2004: Les Carnets de Lucifer – Mon Journal Intime, Les Belles Lettres.
 2006: Skizogrammes, Pantoums, Éditions Bibliophane.
 2008: Mère Patrie, Planète Mère, Éditions Pascal Petiot. Lauriers Verts award at La Forêt des Livres in 2008.
 2009: La bataille Hadopi, In Libro Veritas (group of authors).
 2009: Mise en Demeure à Monsieur le Président de la République Française, Jean-Claude Gawsewitch Éditeur.
 2011: Révoltons-nous, Éditions in Libro Veritas.

Filmography 

Cinéma
 1995: Marie de Nazareth by Jean Delannoy 
 2008: Astérix at the Olympic Games, by Frédéric Forestier and Thomas Langmann
 2008: Disco, by Fabien Onteniente
 2010: Orso - La Marche de l'Enfant Roi, by Magà Ettori: Senator Vasco

 As a voice actor

 1996: The Hunchback of Notre Dame: French voice of Quasimodo
 2002: The Hunchback of Notre Dame II: French voice of Quasimodo

Other 
He was one of the contestant during the Second season of Danse avec les stars.

See also

See also 
 Music of France
 Chanson française

References 

 Dominique Lacout, Francis Lalanne, Éditions du Rocher, 1993.

External links
 
 Francis Lalanne on Myspace

1958 births
Living people
French male film actors
French male singers
French poets
French singer-songwriters
People from Bayonne
French male voice actors
French male singer-songwriters
People from Mont-de-Marsan
French people of Basque descent
Musicians from Marseille
French people of Uruguayan descent
French people of Lebanese descent